Ernest C. S. Holmboe (1873–1954) was an American architect best known for his work in West Virginia.

Life and career
E. C. S. Holmboe was born in Denmark in 1873, where he studied architecture for four years. He later relocated to Chicago, where he was educated at the Art Institute of Chicago. In the early and mid 1890s he practiced as an architect in Chicago, but by 1899 he had relocated to the much smaller city of Marietta. In 1901 he formed a partnership with Robert C. Lafferty, a native of Wheeling, West Virginia. Lafferty was sent to Clarksburg to open a branch office. Soon afterwards, Holmboe moved the firm's chief office to Clarksburg, and Lafferty ran another branch office, this time at Bluefield. Holmboe & Lafferty grew to become to most prominent architectural firm in the Clarksburg region, but was dissolved in 1920, soon after the end of World War I.

After a brief period alone, Holmboe established a new partnership with Guy M. Pogue, who had been educated by Charles W. Bates and been a practicing architect in Wheeling for five years. Holmboe & Pogue appears to have lasted for only a few years, but completed several major projects, including four county courthouses.

After the dissolution of Holmboe & Pogue, Holmboe practiced on his own at least until the 1940s, though few projects are known. Holmboe died in 1954.

Influence and legacy
Holmboe was well regarded as a designer of fraternal buildings, especially Elks lodges. Buildings of this type by Holmboe & Lafferty were built in such faraway states as Florida and North Dakota.

Works

E. C. S. Holmboe, until 1901
 1899 - Elks Home, 410 Front St, Marietta, Ohio
 Burned in 2001.
 1900 - Masonic Temple, 308 Front St, Marietta, Ohio

Holmboe & Laffery, 1901-1920
 1902 - Cottrill Opera House, East Ave, Thomas, West Virginia
 1902 - Elks Opera House, 212 Federal St, Bluefield, West Virginia
 Remodeled by the firm in 1908.
 1902 - Miners' and Merchants' Bank Building, 172 East Ave, Thomas, West Virginia
 1903 - Bank of Pine Grove Building, Allen Addition St, Pine Grove, West Virginia
 1903 - Empire National Bank Building, 400 W Main St, Clarksburg, West Virginia
 1903 - Virgil L. Highland House, 240 E Main St, Clarksburg, West Virginia
 1904 - Braxton County Jail, Main St, Sutton, West Virginia
 1904 - Grafton Banking and Trust Building, W Main & Ethel Sts, Grafton, West Virginia
 Demolished.
 1904 - St. Mary's Hospital, Washington Ave, Clarksburg, West Virginia
 Demolished.
 1904 - West Side School (former), 304 Beech St, Grafton, West Virginia
 1905 - Garrett County Jail, E Alder St, Oakland, Maryland
 Demolished in the 1970s.
 1905 - Old Main, Marshall College, Huntington, West Virginia
 1906 - McGuffey and Wilson Halls (Remodeling), Ohio University, Athens, Ohio
 Conversion into dormitories.
 1906 - Welch High School (former), Howard St, Welch, West Virginia
 Burned.
 1907 - First Baptist Church (former), 100 Duhring St, Bluefield, West Virginia
 1907 - Lantz Hall, Massanutten Academy, Woodstock, Virginia
 1907 - Morgan County Courthouse, 202 Fairfax St, Berkeley Springs, West Virginia
 Destroyed by fire in 2006.
 1907 - Tunnelton Bank Building, North St, Tunnelton, West Virginia
 1908 - Elks Home, 1015 4th Ave, Huntington, West Virginia
 1909 - Administration Building, Salem College, Salem, West Virginia
 1910 - Citizens National Bank Building, 47 Church St, Philippi, West Virginia
 1910 - Cumberland City Hall, N Center St, Cumberland, Maryland
 1910 - Elks Home, 411 W Pike St, Clarksburg, West Virginia
 Burned in 2002.
 1910 - Haymond Apartments, 444 W Main St, Clarksburg, West Virginia
 1911 - Rhea Terrace Apartments, Rhea Ter, Fairmont, West Virginia
 1911 - Whitescarver Hall, Broaddus College, Philippi, West Virginia
 1912 - Elks Home, 103 W Frederick St, Staunton, Virginia
 1912 - Elks Home, 425 N Florida Ave, Tampa, Florida
 Demolished in 1962.
 1912 - Harpers Ferry High School (Old), 847 Washington St, Harpers Ferry, West Virginia
 1912 - Thomas W. Koon House, 221 Baltimore Ave, Cumberland, Maryland
 1912 - Miners Hospital, Hospital Rd, Frostburg, Maryland
 Demolished in 1997.
 1913 - Parsons High School, 501 Chestnut St, Parsons, West Virginia
 Demolished.
 1913 - Second National Bank Building, 102 S Main St, Culpeper, Virginia
 1914 - Columbia Street School, 311 Columbia Street, Cumberland, Maryland
 1914 - Elks Club, 139 W 5th St, East Liverpool, Ohio
 1914 - First M. E. Church, 1539 W Pike St, Adamston, West Virginia
 1914 - Clyde E. Hutchinson House (Sonnencroft), Morgantown Ave, Fairmont, West Virginia
 Demolished in the 1960s.
 1914 - Moorefield Graded and High School, 400 N Main St, Moorefield, West Virginia
 Demolished.
 1915 - Elks Home, 424 5th St NE, Devils Lake, North Dakota
 Demolished.
 1916 - Gilmer County Jail, 201 N Court St, Glenville, West Virginia
 1916 - Sperry Hall, Massanutten Academy, Woodstock, Virginia
 1917 - Hepzibah Public School, Shinnston Pk, Hepzibah, West Virginia
 1918 - Ellsworth School, 504 Cherry St, Middlebourne, West Virginia
 1918 - Victory High School, 1636 W Pike St, Adamston, West Virginia
 1920 - Roosevelt-Wilson High School (former), 116 Pennsylvania Ave, Nutter Fort, West Virginia

Holmboe & Pogue, from 1920
 1921 - Hampshire County Courthouse, 50 S High St, Romney, West Virginia
 1922 - Ritchie County Courthouse, 115 E Main St, Harrisville, West Virginia
 1922 - Sistersville Junior High School (former), Work St, Sistersville, West Virginia
 1922 - Tyler County Courthouse (Remodeling), 121 Court St, Middlebourne, West Virginia
 1923 - Virginia Lee Harrison Gymnasium, Massanutten Academy, Woodstock, Virginia
 Presently a dormitory.
 1924 - Pleasants County Courthouse, 301 Court Ln, St. Marys, West Virginia

E. C. S. Holmboe
 1929 - Shepherdstown High School (Old), 54 Minden Ave, Shepherdstown, West Virginia
 1937 - Circleville School, Price Way, Circleville, West Virginia

References

Architects from West Virginia
20th-century American architects
People from Clarksburg, West Virginia
Danish architects
School of the Art Institute of Chicago alumni
1873 births
1954 deaths